HC Dynamo Moscow (Russian: Динамо Москва) is a Russian professional ice hockey club based in Moscow. They are members of the Tarasov Division in the Kontinental Hockey League (KHL).

Note: GP = Games played, W = Wins, L = Losses, T = Ties, OTL = Overtime/shootout losses, Pts = Points, GF = Goals for, GA = Goals against, PIM = Penalties in minutes

International Hockey League champions

In 1993-94 and 1995–96, the winner of the Regular Season became the League Champion. After the season was the IHL Cup - it was a single event. In 1992-93 and 1994–95, the winner of the Playoffs became the League Champion.

IHL Cup

Russian Cup

Seasons
HC Dynamo
HC Dynamo seasons
HC Dynamo Moscow